John Thomson (29 May 1865 – 27 February 1947) was an Australian politician. He was the Nationalist member for Claremont in the Western Australian Legislative Assembly from 1921 to 1924, becoming an Independent Nationalist in 1924.

References

1865 births
1947 deaths
Nationalist Party of Australia members of the Parliament of Western Australia
Independent members of the Parliament of Western Australia
Members of the Western Australian Legislative Assembly
Place of birth missing